Henry Grantland "Granny" Rice (November 1, 1880July 13, 1954) was an early 20th-century American sportswriter known for his elegant prose. His writing was published in newspapers around the country and broadcast on the radio.

Early years
Rice was born in Murfreesboro, Tennessee, the son of Bolling Hendon Rice, a cotton dealer, and Mary Beulah (Grantland) Rice. His grandfather Major H. W. Rice was a Confederate veteran of the Civil War.

Rice attended Montgomery Bell Academy and Vanderbilt University in Nashville, where he was a member of the football team for three years, a shortstop on the baseball team, a brother in the Phi Delta Theta fraternity,  and graduated with a BA degree in 1901 in classics. On the football team, he lettered in the year of 1899 as an end and averaged two injuries a year. On the baseball team, he was captain in 1901.

Sportswriter

In 1907, Rice saw what he would call the greatest thrill he ever witnessed in his years of watching sports during the Sewanee–Vanderbilt football game: the catch by Vanderbilt center Stein Stone, on a double-pass play then thrown near the end zone by Bob Blake to set up the touchdown run by Honus Craig that beat Sewanee at the very end for the SIAA championship. Vanderbilt coach Dan McGugin in Spalding's Football Guides summation of the season in the SIAA wrote, "The standing. First, Vanderbilt; second, Sewanee, a mighty good second;" and that Aubrey Lanier "came near winning the Vanderbilt game by his brilliant dashes after receiving punts." Rice coached the 1908 Vanderbilt baseball team.

Rice was an advocate for the emerging game of golf in the United States. He became interested in the sport in 1909 while covering the Southern Amateur at the Nashville Golf Club. It was not his first golf event, but it was the one that seemed to pull him toward the game.

After taking early jobs with the Atlanta Journal and the Cleveland News, he later became a sportswriter for the Nashville Tennessean. The job at the Tennessean was given to him by former Sewanee Tigers coach Billy Suter, who coached baseball teams against which Rice played while at Vanderbilt. Afterwards he obtained a series of prestigious jobs with major newspapers in the northeastern United States. In 1914 he began his Sportlight column in the New York Tribune. He also provided monthly Grantland Rice Sportlights as part of Paramount newsreels from 1925 to 1954. He is best known for being the successor to Walter Camp in the selection of College Football All-America Teams beginning in 1925, and for being the writer who dubbed the great backfield of the 1924 Notre Dame Fighting Irish football team the "Four Horsemen" of Notre Dame. A Biblical reference to the Four Horsemen of the Apocalypse, this famous account was published in the New York Herald Tribune on October 18, describing the Notre Dame vs. Army game played at the Polo Grounds in New York City:

The passage added great import to the event described and elevated it to a level far beyond that of a mere football game. This passage, although famous, is far from atypical, as Rice's writing tended to be of an "inspirational" or "heroic" style, raising games to the level of ancient combat and their heroes to the status of demigods.  He became even better known after his columns were nationally syndicated beginning in 1930, and became known as the "Dean of American Sports Writers". He and his writing are among the reasons that the 1920s in the United States are sometimes referred to as the "Golden Age of Sports". Rice's all-time All-America backfield was Jim Thorpe, Red Grange, Ken Strong, and Ernie Nevers.

His sense of honor can be seen in his own actions. Before leaving for service in World War I, he entrusted his entire fortune, about $75,000 (the equivalent of around $1.4 million today), to a friend. On his return from the war, Rice discovered that his friend had lost all the money in bad investments, and then had committed suicide. Rice accepted the blame for putting "that much temptation" in his friend's way. Rice then made monthly contributions to the man's widow throughout his life.

According to author Mark Inabinett in his 1994 work, Grantland Rice and His Heroes: The Sportswriter as Mythmaker in the 1920s, Rice very consciously set out to make heroes of sports figures who impressed him, most notably Jack Dempsey, Babe Ruth, Bobby Jones, Bill Tilden, Red Grange, Babe Didrikson, and Knute Rockne.  Unlike many writers of his era, Rice defended the right of football players such as Grange, and tennis players such as Tilden, to make a living as professionals, but he also decried the warping influence of big money in sports, once writing in his column:

Rice authored a book of poetry, Songs of the Stalwart, which was published in 1917 by D. Appleton and Company of New York.

Personal life

Rice married Fannie Katherine Hollis on April 11, 1906; they had one child, the actress Florence Rice. Rice died at the age 73 on July 13, 1954, following a stroke. He is interred at Woodlawn Cemetery in the Bronx, New York City.

Legacy

In 1951, in recognition of Rice's 50 years in journalism, an anonymous donor contributed $50,000 to establish the Grantland Rice Fellowship in Journalism with the New York Community Trust. In 1954, the Football Writers Association of America established the Grantland Rice Trophy, an annual award presented (from 1954 to 2013) to the college football team recognized by the FWAA as the National Champions. The Grantland Rice Bowl, an annual college football bowl game held from 1964 to 1977, was named in his honor, as was the Grantland Rice Award given to the winner. Rice was posthumously awarded the 1966 J. G. Taylor Spink Award by the Baseball Writers' Association of America. The award, presented the following year at the annual induction ceremony at the Baseball Hall of Fame, is given for "meritorious contributions to baseball writing".

At Vanderbilt, a four-year scholarship named for Rice and former colleague and fellow Vanderbilt alumnus Fred Russell is awarded each year to an incoming first-year student who intends to pursue a career in sportswriting. Recipients of the Fred Russell–Grantland Rice Sportswriting Scholarship include author and humorist Roy Blount, Jr.; Skip Bayless of Fox Sports and Andrew Maraniss. The press box in Vanderbilt Stadium at Vanderbilt University is dedicated to Rice and named after Rice's protégé, Fred Russell. For many years, a portion of one floor of the Columbia University Graduate School of Journalism was designated the "Grantland Rice Suite". Grantland Avenue in his hometown of Murfreesboro, Tennessee, was named in his honor.

Rice was mentioned in an I Love Lucy episode entitled "The Camping Trip", and was portrayed by actor Lane Smith, also a native of Tennessee, in The Legend of Bagger Vance. On June 8, 2011, ESPN's Bill Simmons launched a sports and popular culture website titled Grantland, a name intended to honor Rice's legacy. It operated for a little more than four years until being shuttered by ESPN on October 30, 2015, several months after Simmons's departure.

References

Further reading

External links

 
 
 J. G. Taylor Spink Award – 1966 winner
 Alumnus Football by Grantland Rice
 The Answer by Grantland Rice

1880 births
1954 deaths
United States Army personnel of World War I
Major League Baseball broadcasters
New York Herald Tribune people
Notre Dame Fighting Irish football
Vanderbilt Commodores football players
Vanderbilt Commodores baseball players
Vanderbilt Commodores baseball coaches
BBWAA Career Excellence Award recipients
People from Murfreesboro, Tennessee
Sportswriters from Tennessee
Burials at Woodlawn Cemetery (Bronx, New York)
Sportswriters from New York (state)